Feni Junction Railway Station (Bengali: ফেনী জংশন রেলওয়ে স্টেশন) is a railway station located in Feni Sadar Upazila, Feni District, Chittagong Division, Bangladesh.

History 
The Assam Bengal Railway Company, formed in England in 1892, took charge of the construction of railways in the country. On 1 July 1895, the 150 km meter-gauge line from Chittagong to Cumilla and the 69 km railway line from Laksam to Chandpur were opened to the public. Feni railway station was constructed as a station on the Chittagong-Cumilla line. When the Agartala railway was built from Feni to Bilonia in 1929, Feni became a junction station.

Services 
17 trains ply through the Feni Junction railway station. The following is a list of trains plying through Feni Railway Station:

 Subarna Express
 Paharika Express
 Mohanagar Provati/Godhuli Express
 Udayan Express
 Meghna Express
 Mohanagar Express
 Turna Express
 Bijoy Express
 Sonar Bangla Express
 Mymensingh Express
 Karnafuli Express
 Dhaka-Chittagong Mail
 Sagarika Express
 Chattala Express
 Laksam Commuter
 Jalalabad Express, and
 Local train

References 

Railway stations in Chittagong Division
Railway junction stations in Bangladesh
Railway stations opened in 1895
1895 establishments in British India